The South Branch Little Sugar River is an  river in Gladwin County, Michigan. It is a tributary of the Sugar River, which flows via the Tittabawassee River to the Saginaw River.

See also
List of rivers of Michigan

References

External links
Michigan  Streamflow Data from the USGS

Rivers of Michigan
Rivers of Gladwin County, Michigan
Tributaries of Lake Huron